Bill Agnew (14 April 1910 – 27 March 1961) was a Scotland international rugby union footballer. He played for Stewart's College FP at the Lock position.

Rugby Union career

Amateur career

Agnew played for Stewart's College FP at the Lock position.

Provincial career

Agnew represented Edinburgh District. He played in the 1930 Inter-City match against Glasgow District.

International career

Agnew played for Scotland twice.

He played in two matches of the 1930 Five Nations tournament.

He made his debut against Wales on 1 February 1930 at Murrayfield Stadium Scotland won that match 12 - 9. He second and final appearance was against Ireland at Murrayfield Stadium on 22 February 1930. Ireland won that match 14 - 11.

References

1910 births
1961 deaths
Rugby union players from Glasgow
Scottish rugby union players
Scotland international rugby union players
Stewart's College FP players
Edinburgh District (rugby union) players
Rugby union locks